Poseidon has been the name of a number of ships, both real and in fiction.

Real ships
 SS Poseidon was 1968–1969 the name of a steam cargo ship built in 1941 for the British Government and originally named Empire Ballard.
 BN Poseidon was 1951–1959 the name of a coastal tanker launched in 1942 as Empire Faun
 ST Poseidon was 1973–1976 the name of a steam tug built in 1941 for the British Government and originally named Empire Fir.
  was a Royal Navy , launched in 1929 and sunk in 1931.
  was a United States Navy , built in 1944 and sold off in 1961.
 , a Gato-class submarine

In fiction
 , the subject of the 1969 novel The Poseidon Adventure as well as the films based on that novel: The Poseidon Adventure (1972), Beyond the Poseidon Adventure (1979), The Poseidon Adventure (2005), and Poseidon (2006).
 USS Poseidon, a US Navy attack submarine in the 2005 film Phantom Below.

See also
 , a Greek submarine class
 Poseidon (disambiguation)

Ship names

pt:SS Poseidon